

January

January 8 - Two militants and two soldiers were killed and another five soldiers were wounded in clashes in Chechnya.
January 9 - Four soldiers and four militants have been killed and sixteen servicemen were wounded in a shootout in Chechnya.
January 13 - Two policemen wounded in Dagestan.
January 27 - Three militants killed in Ingushetia

February

February 11 - Four militants and one security forces member killed and another security forces member wounded in Dagestan.
February 15 - Four servicemen have been killed in a shootout with militants in Chechnya.
February 27 - The bodies of five hunters were discovered in a forest in Dagestan

March

March 2 - Two militants killed in Dagestan and a police officer and a passer-by were killed in Makhachkala.
March 3 - Two militants killed in Ingushetia 
March 4 - Three policemen and a gunman died during an attack on a polling station in Dagestan on Sunday.
March 6 - A suicide bomber in Dagestan detonated a bomb near a police station killing at least four police officers.
March 12 - Six militants were killed in Kabardino-Balkaria.
March 16 - Three militants killed by police in Kabardino-Balkaria 
March 18 - One security officer was killed and another two injured and two militants killed in Dagestan.
March 30 - One policeman was killed and another injured when unidentified assailants opened fire on a police guard detail in Makhachkala, the capital of Dagestan, a woman passerby was also killed and a man injured and taken to hospital.
March 30 - An FSB officer died in hospital on Friday after being injured when a bomb went off in his car in Nazran, the capital of Ingushetia.
March 30 - A member of the security services and his wife were hospitalized after a bomb went off in a car in Nazran, the capital of Ingushetia.

April

April 5 - Four police officers were injured on Thursday in a roadside bomb detonated in the city of Malgobek in Ingushetia.
April 8 - A suspected militant was killed in a security operation in Dagestan.
April 19 - Three suspected militants were killed in Dagestan.
April 23 - At least 11 militants killed in Dagestan, Chechnya 
April 25 - Three militants were killed on Tuesday night in Khasavyurt, a city in Dagestan.
April 28 - Two policemen were killed and one injured when a police car was blown up on Saturday just outside the town of Malgobek in Ingushetia.

May

May 3 - 2012 Makhachkala attack
May 6 - A new blast hit the capital of Dagestan on Sunday, injuring one person.
May 11 - Three Islamist insurgents, including a man tasked with delivering judgment according to sharia law, were killed by law enforcement officers in Kizlyar forest in Dagestan on Friday.
May 12 - Six insurgents killed in Dagestan.
May 14 - Militant leader killed in Dagestan.
May 20 - Police killed two suspected militants in a security operation in Dagestan.
May 24 - Soldier killed by explosive device in Ingushetia.
May 30 - Dagestan deputy sports minister Nasyr Gadzhikhanov was killed when his car was attacked by gunmen in Makhachkala.

June

June 1 - A traffic police officer was killed in Dagestan on Friday 
June 1 - Two law enforcement officers were killed in Kabardino-Balkaria on Friday.
June 8 - Six militants killed in Dagestan.
June 10 - Three militants have been killed in Kabardino-Balkaria.
June 10 - Five police officers and a 19-year-old civilian were injured late on Saturday by a grenade blast in Ingushetia.
June 16 - Two militants suspected of planning assassination of Chechen leader Ramzan Kadyrov were killed on Friday night in Grozny.
June 21 - Four security officers were injured when unknown gunmen attacked their car in Dagestan.
June 27 - Two militant warlords and a policeman was killed and two others wounded in Dagestan.

July

July 1 - Unknown gunmen shot dead a police officer in Dagestan.
July 3 - A militant leader was killed on Tuesday in Kabardino-Balkaria.
July 14 - Seven gunmen and a member of the security forces died in an anti-terrorist operation in Dagestan on Saturday.
July 21 - Unidentified assailants on Saturday opened fire against a military convoy in Ingushetia, killing at least two servicemen.
July 27 - Six militants and a female suicide bomber were killed on Friday in Dagestan in a firefight with security forces.
July 28 - Two police officers were injured on Saturday when a roadside bomb exploded near their vehicle in Ingushetia.
July 28 - A police patrolman was shot dead late on Friday in a remote village in Dagestan.

August

August 1 - Two police officers were injured on Wednesday afternoon in a bomb blast in Derbent, Dagestan.
August 5 - One militant killed and police officer was killed and another one was injured during an anti-militant raid in the capital of Dagestan.
August 6 - Two police officers were killed and one injured when their car came under fire in Dagestan.
August 6 - Four people were confirmed dead and three others injured in an apparent suicide blast on August 6 in the Chechen capital of Grozny.
August 9 - At least five police officers and three militants were killed on Thursday in a shootout in Dagestant.
August 14 - Two traffic police were killed in a shooting in Dagestan on Tuesday.
August 18 - Eight people were injured during an attack on believers in a Dagestani mosque on the eve of the Muslim holiday of Eid ul-Fitr, medics said on Saturday.
August 19 - At least 7 or eight people were killed and 15 injured after a suicide bomber blew himself up at a policeman funeral in Ingushetia.
August 24 - A serviceman was killed and another injured in an attack on a military convoy in Dagestan on Friday.
August 25 - Two militants have been killed by Russian security forces in Dagestan.
August 28 - A serviceman in the Dagestan settlement of Belidzhi on Tuesday went on shooting spree and killed seven of his fellow soldiers.
August 28 - A spiritual leader of Dagestan Muslims, Sheikh Said Afandi, and five other people were killed in a blast carried out by a female suicide bomber in the Dagestan settlement of Chirkey.
August 28 - Three militants have been killed and several have been detained on Tuesday in a large-scale security operation in the town of Malgobek in Ingushetia.

September

September 2 - Two alleged Islamist insurgents attacked police during a document check in Dagestan on Sunday, but were killed by return fire.
September 5 - Six police officers were killed and several more were injured when a group of unidentified assailants fired on a motor convoy in Ingushetia on Wednesday.
September 6 - One police officer was killed when a bomb planted under his car detonated on Thursday in the Chechen capital of Grozny.
September 13 - One police officer was killed and two others were injured in an attack in Dagestan on Thursday.
September 15 - Five Islamic insurgents and one police officer were killed in Dagestan in a skirmish with security forces on Saturday.
September 19 - Five militants were killed late on Tuesday during a counter-terrorism operation in Ingushetia.
September 20 - At least four militants and two police officers were killed on Thursday during a special police operation in Chechnya, Chechen leader Ramzan Kadyrov said.

October

 October 16 - Two gunmen shelling military patrol killed in Dagestan.
 October 18 - Traffic police officer shot dead in Magas, Ingushetia.

November

December

See also
List of clashes in the North Caucasus in 2009
List of clashes in the North Caucasus in 2010
List of clashes in the North Caucasus in 2011
List of clashes in the North Caucasus in 2014
List of clashes in the North Caucasus in 2015
List of clashes in the North Caucasus in 2016
List of clashes in the North Caucasus in 2017
List of clashes in the North Caucasus in 2018
List of clashes in the North Caucasus in 2019

References

Conflicts in 2012
Lists of clashes in the North Caucasus
2012 in Russia